Belgium was represented by Pas de Deux, with the song "Rendez-vous", at the 1983 Eurovision Song Contest, which took place in Munich on 30 April. The 1983 preselection has gone down as the most controversial in Belgian Eurovision history due to the extreme hostility shown by the audience towards Pas de Deux's victory.

Before Eurovision

Eurosong 
The selection consisted of three semi-finals, followed by the final on 19 March 1983. All the shows were hosted by Luc Appermont and took place at the Amerikaans Theater in Brussels.

Semi-finals
Three semi-finals were held to select the nine songs for the Belgian final. Nine acts had been invited to participate, and each performed three songs with an expert jury choosing the best song from each act to go forward to the final. There was one semi-final each for male singers, female singers and groups.

Final
The national final was held on 19 March 1983 with nine songs competing. Voting was by an expert jury of eight members, who each ranked their top four songs and awarded them 10, 7, 5 and 1 point(s). Pas de Deux were the runaway winners, being placed first by six of the eight jury members The audience in the theatre appeared to be rooting for a Bart Kaëll win, and as it became obvious midway through the voting that Pas de Deux were heading for a clear victory, pandemonium ensued, with each voting announcement being greeted with jeers, whistles and catcalls. Many walked out in disgust before the end of the transmission and Pas de Deux (who seemed to find the audience reaction amusing rather than upsetting) reprised their winning song to a half-empty house, having to compete against a chorus of jeers and booing.

At Eurovision 
On the night of the final Pas de Deux performed 19th in the running order, following Austria and preceding the eventual winner Luxembourg. At the close of the voting "Rendez-vous" had received only 13 votes (8 from Spain, 4 from the United Kingdom and 1 from Portugal), placing Belgium 18th of the 20 entries, ahead only of the nul-points Spanish and Turkish entries. The Belgian jury awarded its 12 points to Yugoslavia.

Voting

References

External links 
 Belgian Preselection 1983

1983
Countries in the Eurovision Song Contest 1983
Eurovision
Television controversies in Belgium
Music controversies